Jay Lambert (November 21, 1925 – February 6, 2012) was an American amateur and professional boxer, medical doctor and general surgeon in Salt Lake City, Utah. He was the 1948 U.S Olympic Trials Champion and represented the United States as a heavy weight in the 1948 Summer Olympics in London, England. Lambert fought professionally from 1948-1950 before leaving the sport to pursue a career in medicine.

Early life 
Elbert Jay Lambert was born on November 21, 1925 to Aleta Elvera (Vera) Rasmussen and Joseph Hovey Lambert in the small town of Helper, Utah. He had five siblings: brothers Joseph (1919), Tony (1921), and Clyde (1924), and sisters Marian (1917) and Martha (1931). In 1932 the family moved from Helper to the Point of the Mountain near Lehi, Utah where they opened and operated a filling station/diner and pig farm. His older brothers were involved in boxing at a local boxing club and Jay and his oldest brother Joe became part of a boxing training camp operated by Marv Jensen, legendary trainer of Utah boxing legend Gene Fulmer, in West Jordan, Utah. Lambert graduated from Lehi High school.

Amateur, Olympic and professional boxing career 
Prior to joining Marv Jensen's camp, Lambert won the Intermountain AAU tournament middle weight division in 1941 and heavy weight division in 1942. He went on to win the Intermountain AAU Championship in 1943; and was a two time Intermountain Intercollegiate champ and Intermountain AAU title holder. In 1947, he won the Intermountain Golden Glove Heavy Weight championship and the Intermountain Intercollegiate Heavy Weight championship and was given the Outstanding Boxer award. In 1948, he won the Intermountain AAU title. In 1948, at the age of 22, Lambert won the U.S Boxing Olympic Trials in the Boston Garden, Boston, Massachusetts securing a spot on the 1948 U.S. Olympic Team. Through three Olympic Trial tournaments, Lambert notched notable victories over Rex Layne, who would later go on to fight Rocky Marciano, Ezzard Charles, and Jersey Joe Walcott, as a top professional heavyweight contender in the 1950’s, and Norvel Lee in the tournament's final; Lee would go on to win a gold medal as a light heavyweight in the 1952 Helsinki Olympics. In London, Lambert fought his way to the quarterfinals before losing a split decision to Johnny Arthur of South Africa.

Lambert turned professional in the wake of the Olympics and compiled an 8-3-1 professional record as well as an exhibition match with Joe Louis in 1949. Still considered a contender in the spring of 1950, Lambert left the sport to attend medical school, using his professional boxing earnings to support his medical education.

Lambert was inducted into the Utah Sport Hall of Fame in 1977.

Medical career after boxing 
Jay Lambert graduated from the University of Utah Medical School in 1954, beginning his general surgery residency at Sloan-Kettering Memorial Center in New York and finishing at LDS Hospital in Salt Lake City Utah.  He joined the staff of LDS Hospital in 1959 as a general surgeon. He continued to practice medicine in Salt Lake City until retiring in 1997.

Lambert remained active in the local boxing community throughout his life donating his services for over 40 years as the ringside physician for the Golden Gloves Amateur Boxing in Utah and as the team physician for Granite High School football in the 70's and 80's.

E. Jay Lambert, M.D. passed away February 6, 2012.

Other facts 
Lambert was a member of the Church of Jesus Christ of Latter-day Saints.

Lambert served in United States Air Force as an aviator cadet

References

Sources
bio on Lamber's boxing
"Utah boxing community mourns death of boxer, physician Jay Lambert". The Salt Lake Tribune
2009 Deseret Morning News Church Almanac (Salt Lake City, Utah: Deseret Morning News, 2008), p. 326.
South Valley School article on Jenson

Latter Day Saints from Utah
1925 births
2012 deaths
People from Helper, Utah
Olympic boxers of the United States
Boxers at the 1948 Summer Olympics
American male boxers
Boxers from Utah
Heavyweight boxers